The 2016 Women's Junior World Handball Championship was the 20th edition of the tournament and took place in Moscow, Russia from 2 to 15 July 2016. Denmark won their second title after defeating Russia 32–28 in the final.

Teams
Africa

Asia

Europe
 (Substitute for Oceania)

 (Host)

Pan-America

Venues
Matches will be played in Moscow.

Krylatskoye Sports Palace (5,000)
Alexander Gomelsky Universal Sports Hall CSKA (5,500)

Referees
The following 16 referee pairs were selected.

Preliminary round
All time are local (UTC+3).

Group A

Group B

Group C

Group D

President's Cup

21st place bracket

21st–24th place semifinals

23rd place game

21st place game

17th place bracket

17–20th place semifinals

19th place game

17th place game

9–16th placement games
The eight losers of the round of 16 were seeded according to their results in the preliminary round against teams ranked 1–4.

Ranking

15th place game

13th place game

Eleventh place game

Ninth place game

Knockout stage

Bracket

5th place bracket

Round of 16

Quarterfinals

5–8th place semifinals

Semifinals

Seventh place game

Fifth place game

Third place game

Final

Final ranking

Awards
 MVP :  Yaroslava Frolova
 Top Goalscorer :  Song Ji-eun (85 goals)

All-Star Team
 Goalkeeper :  Althea Reinhardt
 Right wing :  Mathilde Rivas Toft
 Right back :  Antonina Skorobogatchenko
 Centre back :  Cristina Laslo
 Left back :  Yulia Golikova
 Left wing :  Lærke Nolsøe
 Pivot :  Annika Ingenpaß

References

External links
Official website

2016 Women's Junior World Handball Championship
Women's Junior World Handball Championship
2016
Sports competitions in Moscow
Women's handball in Russia
Junior World Handball Championship
July 2016 sports events in Europe
2016 in Moscow